The Credit Information Corporation (CIC) is a government-owned and controlled corporation providing credit information system in the Philippines.  It was created in 2008 by the Credit Information System Act (CISA) to construct a centralized, comprehensive credit information system for the collection and dissemination of accurate and fair information relevant to, or arising from, credit and credit-related activities of all entities participating in the financial system.  This credit information is to be collected from various sources such as banks, financial institutions, insurance companies, financing companies, credit cooperatives, as well as utility companies and other businesses that extend loans. The CIC compiles this credit information to help creditors evaluate the ability of borrowers to pay.

The credit information system is intended to straightforwardly address the need for dependable credit information of borrowers and is supposed to significantly improve the overall availability of credit especially to micro, small and medium-scale enterprises; to make credit more cost-effective; and to reduce the dependence on collateral to secure credit facilities.  An efficient credit information system is also supposed to enable financial institutions to reduce their over-all credit risk, contributing to a healthier and more stable financial system.

By law, the credit information should be provided at the least cost to all participants and the CIC should ensure the protection of consumer rights and the existence of fair competition in the industry at all times.

Credit Information System Act
The Credit Information System Act of 2008 (Republic Act No. 9510), also known as CISA  is the act establishing Credit Information Corporation.

Accredited Credit Bureaus 
On March 13, 2016, the CIC announced the accreditation of the first four credit bureaus, three international firms and one national credit bureau.

 CIBI Information, Inc., also known as CIBI, formerly known as Credit Information Bureau, Inc., is the first credit bureau in the Philippines. In 1982, the CIBI started as a quasi-government body to initiate a credit information exchange system in the Philippines under the Central Bank of the Philippines, the Securities and Exchange Commission (SEC), and the Financial Executives Institute of the Philippines (FINEX).  In 1997, Credit Information Bureau, Inc. was incorporated into a private entity and became CIBI Information, Inc. At present, CIBI is a provider of information and intelligence for business, credit and individuals. The company also supplies compliance reports before accrediting suppliers, industry partners and even hiring professionals. Marlo R. Cruz is the current President and CEO of CIBI.
 TransUnion Philippines is a local office of TransUnion that has partnered with banks in the Philippines in 2011.
 Compuscan Philippines was licensed in October 2015 as Compuscan Philippines Inc., a subsidiary of Compuscan, as a Special Accessing Entity (“SAE”). Compuscan Philippines Inc. currently operates from Manila, Philippines.
 CRIF of Italy was established in 1988 and it specializes in credit information systems, business information and credit management solutions.

See also
 Credit bureau in the Philippines

References

Government-owned and controlled corporations of the Philippines
Financial services companies established in 2008
2008 establishments in the Philippines
Credit rating agencies
Economic history of the Philippines
Presidency of Gloria Macapagal Arroyo